PANH is an airline based in Ulan-Ude, Russia. It operates trunk and regional passenger services. Its main base is Ulan-Ude Airport.

History 
The airline was established in 2013 as an affiliate of Bural.

Fleet 

The PANH fleet includes the following aircraft (at March 2013):
4 Cessna 208
3 Let L-410

Destinations

 Buryatia
Bagdarin — Bagdarin Airport 
Kurumkan - Kurumkan Airport 
Kyren - Kyren Airport 
Nizhneangarsk — Nizhneangarsk Airport 
Orlik - Orlik Airport
Taksimo — Taksimo Airport
Ulan-Ude — Ulan-Ude Airport Main hub
 Irkutsk Oblast
Bratsk - Bratsk Airport
Irkutsk - Irkutsk Airport
Kazachinskoe - Kazachinskoe Airport 
Ust-Ilimsk - Ust-Ilimsk Airport

References 

Airlines of Russia
Companies based in Ulan-Ude
Airlines established in 1993